The Human Potential Movement (HPM) arose out of the counterculture of the 1960s and formed around the concept of an extraordinary potential that its advocates believed to lie largely untapped in all people. The movement takes as its premise the belief that through the development of their "human potential", people can experience a life of happiness, creativity, and fulfillment, and that such people will direct their actions within society toward assisting others to release their potential. Adherents believe that the collective effect of individuals cultivating their own potential will be positive change in society at large.

Roots

The HPM has much in common with humanistic psychology in that Abraham Maslow's theory of self-actualization strongly influenced its development.  The Institutes for the Achievement of Human Potential, founded in 1955 by Glenn Doman and Carl Delacato, was an early precursor to and influence on the Human Potential Movement, as is exemplified in Doman's assertion that "Every child born has, at the moment of birth, a greater potential intelligence than Leonardo da Vinci ever used."

In the middle of the 1960s, George Leonard did research across the United States on the subject of human potential for the magazine Look. In his research, he interviewed 37 psychiatrists, brain researchers, and philosophers on the subject of human potential. He found that "Not one of them said we were using more than 10% of our capacity."

During the course of his research, Leonard met Michael Murphy, a co-founder of the nascent Esalen Institute (established in 1962) that at the time was running educational programs for adults on the topic of "human potentialities". Leonard and Murphy became close friends and together "put forth the idea that there should be a human potential movement".

Social influence
HPM was regarded by some as being related to psychedelic culture such as hippies and Summer of Love. According to author Andrew Grant Jackson, George Harrison's adoption of Hindu philosophy and Indian instrumentation in his songs with the Beatles in the mid 1960s, together with the band's highly publicised study of Transcendental Meditation, "truly kick-started" the Human Potential Movement.

As Elizabeth Puttick writes in the Encyclopedia of New Religions:

The human potential movement (HPM) originated in the 1960s as a counter-cultural rebellion against mainstream psychology and organised religion. It is not in itself a religion, new or otherwise, but a psychological philosophy and framework, including a set of values that have made it one of the most significant and influential forces in modern Western society.

Authors and essayists

Aristotle used the principles of potentiality and actuality to analyze causality, motion,  biology, physiology, human psychology and ethics in his tractates on Physics, Metaphysics, Nicomachean Ethics, and De Anima. 

Abraham Maslow published his concept of a hierarchy of needs in a paper in 1943. He argued that as people's basic survival needs are met, so their desire to grow in mental and emotional dimensions increases. He also coined the term "metamotivation" to describe the motivation of people who go beyond the scope of the basic needs and strive for constant betterment.

Michael Murphy and Dick Price founded the Esalen Institute in 1962, primarily as a center for the study and development of human potential, and some people continue to regard Esalen as the geographical center of the movement .

Aldous Huxley gave lectures on the "Human Potential" at Esalen in the early 1960s. His writings and lectures on the mystical dimensions of psychedelics and on what he called "the perennial philosophy" were foundational. Moreover, his call for an institution that could teach the "nonverbal humanities" and the development of the "human potentialities" functioned as the working mission statement of early Esalen.

Christopher Lasch notes the impact of the human potential movement via the therapeutic sector: "The new therapies spawned by the human potential movement, according to Peter Marin, teach that "the individual will is all powerful and totally determines one's fate"; thus they intensify the "isolation of the self".

George Leonard, a magazine writer and editor who conducted research for an article on human potential, became an important early influence on Esalen. Leonard claims that he coined the phrase "Human Potential Movement" during a brainstorming session with Michael Murphy, and popularized it in his 1972 book The Transformation: A Guide to the Inevitable Changes in Humankind. Leonard worked closely with the Esalen Institute afterwards, and in 2005 served as its president.

Martin Seligman emphasized positive psychology during his term as president of the APA beginning in 1998.  Positive psychology focuses on cultivation of eudaimonia, an Ancient Greek term for "the good life" and the concept for reflection on the factors that contribute the most to a well-lived and fulfilling life, often using the terms subjective well-being and happiness interchangeably.

Human Potential in Europe

Interest in Human Potential concepts is growing in Europe thanks to training courses aimed at managers, graduate students, and the unemployed, mainly funded by the European Union in public development courses in the 1980s and 90s. In these courses, modules such as communication skills, marketing, leadership and others in the "soft skills" area were embedded in the programs, and enabled the familiarization of most of the Human Potential concepts. A key role was played by "EU Strategic objective 3, 4, and 5" that explicitly included transversal key competences, such as learning to learn, a sense of initiative, entrepreneurship, and cultural awareness".

These training programs, lasting as much as 900 to 1200 hours aimed at enhancing creativity and innovation, including entrepreneurship, and contained at all levels of education and training Human Potential concepts. One of the core concepts, Maslow's hierarchy of needs, a theory of psychological health predicated on fulfilling innate human needs, became popular in Europe in the 80s mainly as a support to understanding consumer's needs, and only after its use as a key marketing concept. Philip Kotler's book "Marketing Management" was particularly influential in the 80's in popularizing several human potential concepts that were "embedded" in the book and entered in the working and management community.

Specifically targeted books on Human Potential have emerged in Europe and can be found in the works of specific authors. For the "Anglo" cultural area, the work of John Whitmore
contains a harsh critique of mainstream approaches to human potential as fast cures for self-improvement: "Contrary to the appealing claims of The One Minute Manager, there are no quick fixes in business".

For the "Latin" cultural area, an early approach to Human Potential can be found in the work of Maria Montessori. Montessori's theory and philosophy of education were influenced by the work of Jean Marc Gaspard Itard, Édouard Séguin, Friedrich Fröbel, Johann Heinrich Pestalozzi. Her model emphasized autonomous learning, sensory exploration and training children in physical activities, empowering their senses and thoughts by exposure to sights, smells, and tactile experiences, and later included, problem solving.

Notable proponents 

 Abraham Maslow (1908–1970)
 Alan Watts (1915–1973)
 Aldous Huxley (1894–1963)
 Carl Rogers (1902–1987)
Chungliang Al Huang (b. 1937)
 Fritz Perls (1893–1970)
 Gerald Heard (1889–1971)
 Harvey Jackins (1916–1999)
 Joshua L. Liebman (1907–1948)
 Viktor Frankl (1905–1997)
 Viola Spolin (1906–1994)
 William James (1842–1910), an early proponent

 Alexander Everett (1921–2005)
 Anthony Robbins (b. 1960)
 Fernando Flores (b. 1943)
 George Leonard (1923–2010)
 Harold C. Lyon, Jr. (1935-2019)
 Jean Houston (b. 1937)
 John Heider (1936 - 2010)
 Marilyn Ferguson (1938–2008)
 Michael Murphy (b. 1930)
 Moshé Feldenkrais (1904–1984)
 Stan Dale (1929–2007)
 Werner Erhard (b. 1935)
 William Schutz (1925–2002)
 Scott Barry Kaufman
 Gerda Boyesen (1922-2005)

See also
 Drug culture
 Humanistic psychology
 Personal development
 Organizations
 Erhard Seminars Training (San Francisco based "est", 1971-1984) followed by "The Forum" and Landmark Worldwide (from 1991)
 Lifespring (founded 1974 in southern California)
 Ten percent of the brain myth

Notes

References

Further reading
 Bendeck Sotillos, Samuel "Prometheus and Narcissus in the Shadows of the Human Potential Movement" AHP Perspective, December 2012/January 2013, pp. 6–12.
 Enablers, T.C., 2014. 'Realising Human Potential'. Internet Source cited Jan, 2015.
 Enablers, T.C., 2014. 'The Fastest Growing New Social Movement on the Planet' Internet Source cited Nov. 2014.

External links

New religious movement, Wikiquote

 
Personal development
Humanism